Hayatullah is a citizen of Pakistan who has been reported to be a leader of the militant group Tehreek-e-Taliban.
According to Pakistan's Daily Times he was reported to have been the group's commander for the Swat valley.
He was reported to have been tied to Maulvi Fazlullah.
The Sindh police's Special Investigations unit reported he had been captured in a raid in Balong Goth in Orangi Town on 12 January 2010.

United Press International reports he works in the telecommunications sector.

References

Living people
Taliban leaders
Pashtun people
Tehrik-i-Taliban Pakistan members
Pakistani Islamists
Year of birth missing (living people)